McCutcheon High School is located in Lafayette, Indiana, located on Old 231 South. The school was established in 1975 with the merger of Wainwright and Southwestern high schools and is named after John T. McCutcheon, who was a political cartoonist and Tippecanoe County native. It has been active in the North Central Conference since 2014.

Academic Teams

 Academic Quiz Bowl
 Academic Spell Bowl
 Academic Super Bowl
 FIRST Robotics Competition Team 4272
 Science Olympiad 
 Speech Team

Athletics
The following sports are offered at McCutcheon:

Baseball (Boys)
State Runner Up - 1994
State Champs - 1999, 2003
Basketball (Girls)
State Runner Up - 1993
Basketball (Boys)
State Runner up - 2016
Bowling (Girls & Boys)
Cheerleading (Co-Ed)
Cross Country (Girls & Boys)
Football (Boys)
State Runner Up - 1982
Unified Football (Co-Ed)
State Runner Up - 2019
State Champion - 2020
Golf (Girls & Boys)
Gymnastics (Girls)
Soccer (Girls & Boys)
Softball (Girls)
State Runner Up - 2005
State Champs - 2008
Swimming & Diving (Girls & Boys)
Tennis (Girls & Boys)
Track & Field (girls & boys)
Volleyball (Girls and Boys)
State Runner Up (Girls) - 1982, 1989
State Champion (Girls) - 2021
Wrestling (Boys)

Notable alumni
Jeremy Camp - contemporary Christian Singer
Shannon Hoon - singer, Blind Melon
Clayton Richard - pitcher, San Diego Padres
Brian Price - defensive tackle, Dallas Cowboys
Nick Wittgren - pitcher, Cleveland Indians 
Jarrett Maier - actor
 Rob Phinisee, Indiana University basketball guard, hit game-winning 3-point shot to beat rival #3-ranked Purdue University

See also
 List of high schools in Indiana

References

External links
McCutcheon High School
Tippecanoe School Corporation

Public high schools in Indiana
Buildings and structures in Lafayette, Indiana
Schools in Tippecanoe County, Indiana
1975 establishments in Indiana